Hakea lasiocarpha, commonly known as long styled hakea, is a shrub in the family  Proteacea and is endemic  to Western Australia. It has about 30 whitish flowers in clusters in the upper leaf axils, rigid prickly leaves and a limited distribution.

Description
The branchlets are densely covered with long soft hairs. It blooms from May to July and produces white flowers. Each inflorescence is composed of about 30 flowers. After flowering glabrous fruits form that are covered in small black rounded projections.

Taxonomy and naming
Hakea lasiocarpha was first formally described by the botanist Robert Brown and the description was published in the Supplementum primum prodromi florae Novae Hollandiae. The only known synonym is Hakea dolichostyla.
The specific epithet is said to be derived from the Greek words  meaning woolly or hairy or shaggy and  meaning small dry body referring to the involucral bracts of the plant.

Distribution
Long styled hakea is endemic to an area along the south coast in the Great Southern region of Western Australia between Albany, Jerramungup and Mount Barker where it is found on hilltops and in valleys growing in sandy-loamy, clay and gravelly soils.

References

lasiocarpha
Eudicots of Western Australia
Plants described in 1830
Taxa named by Robert Brown (botanist, born 1773)